Iceland competed in the Winter Olympic Games for the first time at the 1948 Winter Olympics in St. Moritz, Switzerland.

Alpine skiing

Men

Men's combined

The downhill part of this event was held along with the main medal event of downhill skiing. For athletes competing in both events, the same time was used (see table above for the results). The slalom part of the event was held separate from the main medal event of slalom skiing (included in table below).

Ski jumping

References

 Olympic Winter Games 1948, full results by sports-reference.com

Nations at the 1948 Winter Olympics
1948
Olympics